The DOST Advanced Science and Technology Institute is a research and development organization based in the Quezon City, Philippines. It is one of the research and development institutes of the Department of Science and Technology of the Philippine government.

Background
Advances in information and communications technology and microelectronics led to the establishment of the Advanced Science and Technology Institute (ASTI) in the 1980s. The National Science and Technology Authority (NSTA) was renamed and reorganized as the Department of Science and Technology (DOST) in 1987 by then President Corazon Aquino. The ASTI itself was established on January 30, 1987, through Executive Order No. 128 issued by Aquino. The institute became one of the government's agency which focuses on the field of research and development, information and communications technology and microelectronics.

See also
 Philippine Scientific Earth Observation Microsatellite program

References

Research institutes in the Philippines
Research institutes established in 1987
1987 establishments in the Philippines
Department of Science and Technology (Philippines)
Establishments by Philippine executive order